Jon Benjamin may refer to:

H. Jon Benjamin (born 1966), American actor and comedian
Jon Benjamin (Jewish leader) (born 1964), British lawyer, former chief executive of the Board of Deputies of British Jews

See also
John Benjamin (disambiguation)